Gaius Licinius Geta (fl. 2nd century BC) was a Roman Senator who was elected Roman consul in 116 BC.

Biography
Not much is known about the early career of Geta, who was born into the Plebeian gens Licinia. By 119 BC, he had been elected to the rank of Praetor, and this was followed by his election as consul in 116 BC. After his tenure in office, Geta was expelled from the Senate in 115 BC along with 31 other senators by the order of the two Censors Lucius Caecilius Metellus Diadematus and  Gnaeus Domitius Ahenobarbus.

At a subsequent census, Geta was reinstated as a senator. He was later himself elected as Censor in 108 BC, alongside his consular colleague Quintus Fabius Maximus Eburnus. During their censorship, they reappointed Marcus Aemilius Scaurus as princeps senatus.

References

Sources
 Broughton, T. Robert S., The Magistrates of the Roman Republic, Vol I (1951)
 Smith, William, Dictionary of Greek and Roman Biography and Mythology, Vol II (1867)

2nd-century BC Roman consuls
Senators of the Roman Republic
Geta, Gaius
Year of birth unknown
Year of death unknown